Dragonfly: NASA and the Crisis Aboard Mir is a 1999 book by Bryan Burrough about the Russian Mir space station and the cosmonauts and astronauts who served aboard.  The story centres on astronaut Jerry Linenger and the events on the Shuttle and Mir Space Programme in 1997.

See also
The Buran Spacecraft designed as an equivalent to the US Space Shuttle.
The Energia Rocket, designed to serve as an expendable launch system for the soviet space programme.
Baikonur Cosmodrome, the launch base in Kazakhstan.
Ethylene glycol, the anti-freeze which leaked on board Mir.

External links
 Houston, We Have a Problem.  New York Times Review
 NASA Photo Gallery for STS-84 mission

1999 non-fiction books
Mir
Spaceflight books